Tresoldi is an Italian surname. Notable people with the surname include:

Carlo Tresoldi (1952–1995), Italian footballer
Edoardo Tresoldi, Italian sculptor
Libero Tresoldi (1921–2009), Italian Roman Catholic bishop

Italian-language surnames